Quadrifrons is a Latin word meaning four-fronted or four-faced, and may refer to:

In architecture, the Latin term for a tetrapylon
An aspect of the Roman god Janus

See also
Eremias quadrifrons, a species of lizard in genus Eremias